James Johnson Kelly (March 29, 1928 – December 29, 2018) was a United States Army Air Force/United States Air Force officer who served with the 99th Fighter Squadron and 332nd Fighter Group. He served in the Korean War at the Battle of Chosin Reservoir, and he retired in 1971 as a Major in the Air Force and a Squadron Commander.

Early life and education
Kelly was born in High Point, North Carolina and at an early age his family moved to Lynchburg, Virginia.

Military service

In 1946 Kelly entered the Army Air Forces and he was assigned to the 99th Fighter Squadron and 332nd Fighter Group. Kelly started as a Technical Sergeant and eventually earned a commission at Lackland AFB in 1955, in San Antonio as a First Lieutenant. By the time he retired after 28 years in the Air Force Kelly was a Major. He qualified as an instructor for the AT-6 and T-33. He also became a Squadron Commander.

In the Korean War, Kelly earned medals for evacuating wounded Marines at the Battle of Chosin Reservoir.

Later life
In 1959, he married a single mother (Sally) and became a stepfather for her daughter and later had a son, Thomas Edward Kelly. He held many positions in his chosen hometown, San Antonio, Texas: VC San Antonio Planning Commission, Southern Christian Leadership Conference, Community Workers Council of San Antonio, and he was a trustee on the Our Lady of the Lake University Trustee Board.

He was buried with honors at Fort Sam Houston National Cemetery January 10, 2019.

Awards
Korean Service Medal
UN Service Medal

See also
 Executive Order 9981
 Military history of African Americans

References

Notes

External links
 Tuskegee Airmen at Tuskegee University
 Tuskegee Airmen Archives at the University of California, Riverside Libraries.
 Tuskegee Airmen, Inc.
 Tuskegee Airmen National Historic Site (U.S. National Park Service) 
 Tuskegee Airmen National Museum
 Fly (2009 play about the 332d Fighter Group)

1928 births
2018 deaths
United States Army Air Forces pilots
Tuskegee Airmen
United States Air Force personnel of the Korean War
United States Air Force officers
American Korean War pilots
21st-century African-American people